Tofa'ah ("phenomenon" or "happening") is an Israeli Jewish rock band formed in Jerusalem in 1981. They are notable for being the first all-female Orthodox Jewish band, preceding later groups like Ashira and Bulletproof Stockings. They have released ten albums since 1984.

Overview
Founder Yona Yakobovitz (drums, piano, vocals) moved to Israel from Saratoga Springs, New York in 1981 to attend seminary. There, she befriended and played with other young female musicians and decided to create an outlet for religious women looking to express themselves musically. This became Tofa'ah, which formed that same year with an original lineup featuring Esther Leuchter (vocals), Rachel Kantorowitz (violin), Joy Shapiro (flute), Ann Rahel Silverman-Limor (guitar), Tehilla Shwab (vocals, flute), and Devora Belinky (flute).

Tofa'ah have toured throughout the United States and Israel, performing at venues as diverse as women's prisons, the International Convention Center in Jerusalem, and the court of the Belzer Rebbetzin. They have also appeared several times on Israeli radio and television.

Musical style
The band plays a mix of blues, jazz, and rock and roll, citing as influences Joni Mitchell, Pat Benatar, and Earth, Wind & Fire, with Yakobovitz herself citing Shlomo Carlebach, The Rabbis' Sons, and Diaspora Yeshiva Band.

Band members

Current
Yona Yakobovitz – drums, piano, vocals
Mindy Furher – guitar, banjo, mandolin, vocals
Tamar Attias – flute, whistles
Lois Weinstein – percussion
Susan Hendrickson – percussion
Jessie Schechter – percussion
Samara Hendrickson – vocals, percussion
Karina Auday Karewiecz – bass

Former
Esther Leuchter – vocals
Rachel Kantorowitz – violin
Joy Shapiro – flute
Ann Rahel Limor – guitar
Laiya Rothberg – vocals
Tehilla Shwab – vocals
Elaine Wolman – upright bass
Dvorah Belenky – flute
Linda Levine – electric bass
Nancy Segal – keyboards, backing vocals
Miriam Sandler – vocals
Sunita Staneslow – harp
Tasha Baloo – clarinet
Judy Amsel – violin
Leah Orso – violin

Discography
The Sound of Joyous Song (1984)
For All Time (1996)
B'Simcha (2000)
Dare to Listen (2002)
Azamra (2006)
Feel the Power (2009)
Rejoice (2021)
Lights (2022)

References

External links
Official website

Jewish rock groups
Israeli rock music groups
1981 establishments in Israel
Musical groups established in 1981
Jewish folk rock groups
Jewish jazz musicians
Musical groups from Jerusalem
Orthodox Jewish women musicians
All-female bands